Hangest is part of the name of two communes in the Somme department of northern France:

 Hangest-en-Santerre
 Hangest-sur-Somme